Grihiri is a town in south-western Ivory Coast. It is a sub-prefecture of Sassandra Department in Gbôklé Region, Bas-Sassandra District.

Grihiri was a commune until March 2012, when it became one of 1126 communes nationwide that were abolished.

In 2014, the population of the sub-prefecture of Grihiri was 37,852.

Villages
The 6 villages of the sub-prefecture of Grihiri and their population in 2014 are:
 Boutoubré 1 (4 736)
 Boutoubré 2 (5 558)
 Grihiri (13 218)
 Kouaté (5 760)
 Louhiri (2 557)
 Zahebre (6 023)

References

Sub-prefectures of Gbôklé
Former communes of Ivory Coast